Search engines, including web search engines, selection-based search engines, metasearch engines, desktop search tools, and web portals and vertical market websites have a search facility for online databases.

By content/topic

General 

† Main website is a portal

Geographically localized

Accountancy 
 IFACnet

Business 
 Business.com
 GenieKnows (United States and Canada)
 GlobalSpec
 Nexis (Lexis Nexis)
 Thomasnet (United States)

Computers 
 Shodan (website)

Content 

 Openverse, search engine for open content.

Dark web 

 Ahmia
 Grams
 TorSearch

Education 
General:
 Chegg
 SkilledUp

Academic materials only:
 BASE (search engine)
 ChemRefer
 CiteULike
 Google Scholar
 Library of Congress
 Semantic Scholar

Enterprise 

Apache Solr
 Jumper 2.0: Universal search powered by Enterprise bookmarking
 Oracle Corporation: Secure Enterprise Search 10g
 Q-Sensei: Q-Sensei Enterprise
 Swiftype: Swiftype Search
 TeraText: TeraText Suite

Events 
 Tickex (US, UK)
 TickX (UK, Ireland, Spain, Netherlands)

Food and recipes
 RecipeBridge: vertical search engine for recipes
 Yummly: semantic recipe search

Genealogy 
 Mocavo.com: family history search engine

Job 

 Adzuna (UK)
 CareerBuilder (USA)
 Craigslist (by city)
 Dice.com (USA)
 Glassdoor (USA)
 Indeed (USA)
 JobStreet.com (Southeast Asia, Japan, India)
 Monster.com (USA), (India)
 Naukri.com (India)
 Rozee.pk (Pakistan)
 Yahoo! HotJobs (Countrywise subdomains, International)

Legal 
 Google Scholar
 Lexis (Lexis Nexis)
 Quicklaw
 WestLaw

Medical 
 Bing Health
 Bioinformatic Harvester
 CiteAb (antibody search engine for medical researchers)
 EB-eye EMBL-EBI's Search engine
 Entrez (includes PubMed)
 GenieKnows
 Healia
 Healthline
 Nextbio (Life Science Search Engine)
 PubGene
 Searchmedica
 WebMD

Mobile/handheld 
 Taganode Local Search Engine (now defunct)
 Taptu: taptu mobile/social search (now defunct)

News 
 Bing News
 Google News
 Newslookup
 Nexis (Lexis Nexis)
 Yahoo! News

People 
 FindFace
 PeekYou
 Spokeo
 Zabasearch.com
 ZoomInfo

Real estate/property 
 HotPads.com
 Realtor.com
 Redfin
 Rightmove
 StuRents.com
 Trulia
 Zillow
 Zoopla

Television 
 TV Genius

Video games 
 Wazap

By data type 

Search engines dedicated to a specific kind of information

Maps 
 Baidu Maps
 Bing Maps
 Géoportail
 Google Maps
 MapQuest
 Nokia Maps
 OpenStreetMap
 Petal Maps
 Tencent Maps
 Wikiloc
 WikiMapia
 Yahoo! Maps
 Yandex Maps

Multimedia 

 Bing Videos
 blinkx
 FindSounds
 Google Video
 Munax's PlayAudioVideo
 Openverse, search engine for open content.
 Picsearch
 Pixsta
 Podscope
 SeeqPod
 Songza
 Tencent Video
 TinEye
 TV Genius
 Veveo
 Yahoo! Video

Price 
 Bing Shopping
 Google Shopping (formerly Google Product Search and Froogle)
 Kelkoo
 MySimon
 PriceGrabber
 PriceRunner
 Pronto.com
 Shopping.com
 Shopzilla
 TickX

Source code 
 codeseek.com
 Google Code Search
 Koders
 Krugle

BitTorrent 
These search engines work across the BitTorrent protocol.
 BTDigg
 Isohunt
 Mininova
 The Pirate Bay
 TorrentSpy
 Torrentz

Blog 
 Amatomu
 Bloglines
 IceRocket
 Munax
 Regator
 Technorati

Email 
 TEK

Forum 
 Omgili

Question and answer

Human answers 
 Answers.com
 eHow
 Quora
 Stack Overflow/Stack Exchange Network
 Uclue
 wikiHow
 Yahoo! Answers
Zhihu

Automatic answers 

 AskMeNow
 Wolfram Alpha

By model

Search appliances 

 Fabasoft
 Google Search Appliance - discontinued
 Munax
 Searchdaimon
 Thunderstone

Desktop search engines 
Desktop search engines listed on a light purple background are no longer in active development.

Child-safe search engines 
 Kiddle
 KidRex
 KidzSearch
 QwantJunior
 Swisscows

Metasearch engines

Natural language 

 Ask.com
 Bing (Semantic ability is powered by Powerset)
 Lexxe

Open-source search engines 
 ht://Dig
 Isearch
 Lemur Toolkit & Indri Search Engine
 Lucene
 mnoGoSearch
 Nutch
 Openverse
 Recoll
 Searchdaimon
 Searx
 Seeks
 Sphinx
 SWISH-E
 Terrier Search Engine
 Xapian
 YaCy
 Zettair

Web search engine 
 Gigablast
 Grub

Enterprise search 

Apache Solr
Elasticsearch

P2P search engines

Privacy search engines 

 DuckDuckGo
 HotBot
 MetaGer
 Mojeek
 Qwant
 Searx
 Swisscows
 You.com

Social and environmental focus 
 Ecosia

Semantic browsing engines

Social search engines 

 ChaCha Search
 Delver
 Eurekster
 Facebook Search
 Mahalo.com
 Rollyo
 Sproose
 Trexy

Usenet 
 Google Groups (formerly Deja News)

Visual search engines 

 FindFace
 Grokker
 Macroglossa
 Pixsta
 TinEye
 Viewzi

By popularity

Defunct or acquired search engines 

 AlltheWeb (acquired by Yahoo!)
 AltaVista (acquired by Yahoo! in 2003, shut down in 2013)
 Bixee.com (India) (acquired by Ibibo)
 Blekko (acquired by IBM in 2015 for its use for Watson-based products)
 BlogScope (acquired by Marketwire)
 BRS/Search (now OpenText Livelink ECM Discovery Server)
 Btjunkie
 Cuil (patents acquired by Google after shutdown)
 DeepPeep
 Direct Hit Technologies (acquired by Ask Jeeves in January, 2000)
 FedWorld Information Network (a web and telnet search engine and FTP site specialized to searching for and within United States federal government documents, established in 1992 by the National Technical Information Service and shut down in 2013)
 Getit Infoservices Private Limited
 Google Answers
 GoPubMed
 hakia
 IBM STAIRS
 Infoseek (acquired by Disney)
 Inktomi
 Ixquick (merged into Startpage)
 Jubii
 Kartoo
 LeapFish
 Lotus Magellan
 MetaLib
 mozDex
 Munax
 Myriad Search
 Overture.com (formerly GoTo.com, now Yahoo! Search Marketing) 
 PicoSearch [defunct July 2014] ... 
 PubSub
 RetrievalWare (acquired by Fast Search & Transfer and now owned by Microsoft)
 Scroogle (Google Scraper)
 Singingfish (acquired by AOL)
 Soso
 Speechbot
 Sphere (acquired by AOL)
 Startpage (acquired by System1, an advertising company)
 Tafiti (replaced by Microsoft Bing)
 Volunia
 Wikia Search (defunct)
 WiseNut
 World Wide Web Worm

See also 
 List of academic databases and search engines
 List of web directories
 Search aggregator
 Search engine optimization
 :Category:Search engine software

References

External links 
 

Search engines